Lucius Minicius Rufus was a Roman senator. He was best known as an acquaintance of the philosopher and wonder-worker Apollonius of Tyana.

Rufus is known to have been proconsular governor of Bithynia et Pontus in AD 82/83, then afterwards appointed legatus propraetor, or imperial governor, of Gallia Lugdunensis for the years AD 83 to 87. These offices were followed by ordinary consul as the colleague of the emperor Domitian in AD 88.

Despite these promising achievements, Rufus, along with Servius Cornelius Scipio Salvidienus Orfitus, encountered the wrath of the emperor Domitian. According to Philostratus, Apollonius of Tyana journeyed to Rome to defend them in court. (Vita Apoll., vii.8-34)

References

1st-century Romans
Imperial Roman consuls
Rufus, Lucius
Roman governors of Gallia Lugdunensis
Roman governors of Bithynia and Pontus
Senators of the Roman Empire